Romanzo di una strage (internationally released as Piazza Fontana: The Italian Conspiracy) is a 2012 Italian historical drama film directed by Marco Tullio Giordana. It is loosely based on the book Il segreto di Piazza Fontana by Paolo Cucchiarelli.  
The film deals with the reconstruction of the Piazza Fontana bombing that took place in Milan December 12, 1969, and of the tragic events that ensued, from the death of Giuseppe Pinelli, which occurred in mysterious circumstances during an interrogation, to the death of the Commissioner Luigi Calabresi, who had led the investigation.

In July 2012, Romanzo di una strage entered the 47th Karlovy Vary International Film Festival, where it won the Special Jury Prize. It was nominated to 16 David di Donatello awards, and won three (for best supporting actor, best supporting actress and best visual effects).  It also won three Nastro d'Argento awards (for best script, best actor and best supporting actress)  and two Ciak d'oro (for best supporting actor and best score).

Cast 
 Valerio Mastandrea: Luigi Calabresi
 Pierfrancesco Favino: Giuseppe Pinelli
 Bob Marchese: the President Judge Carlo Biotti
 Fabrizio Gifuni: Aldo Moro
 Omero Antonutti: Giuseppe Saragat
 Laura Chiatti: Gemma Calabresi
 Stefano Scandaletti: Pietro Valpreda
 Michela Cescon: Licia Pinelli
 Giorgio Colangeli: Federico Umberto D'Amato
 Luigi Lo Cascio: Judge Paolillo
 Giorgio Tirabassi: the professor 
 Giorgio Marchesi: Franco Freda
 Denis Fasolo: Giovanni Ventura
 Gianni Musy: confessor of Moro
 Luca Zingaretti: the doctor
 Francesco Salvi: Cornelio Rolandi
 Corrado Invernizzi: Judge Pietro Calogero

References

External links
 

2012 films
2012 drama films
Films directed by Marco Tullio Giordana
Italian historical drama films
2010s historical drama films
Italian films based on actual events
Films about terrorism
Films about terrorism in Europe
Films about miscarriage of justice
Films set in Milan
Depictions of Aldo Moro on film
2010s Italian-language films